Simply Energy is an Australian energy retailer, providing electricity and gas to more than 700,000 accounts across Victoria, South Australia, New South Wales, Queensland and Western Australia, with sales totalling 12% of the Australian market. It is the Australian retail arm of ENGIE, which fully owns Simply Energy.

Products and services
Simply Energy provides electricity and gas to homes and businesses in Victoria, New South Wales, South Australia, Queensland and Western Australia

History
International Power was launched as a retail brand in 2005 by EnergyAustralia, which had recently been purchased by International Power.

In August 2007, International Power Australia completed a buy out of EnergyAustralia interests in Victoria and South Australia. Subsequently, International Power launched the retail brand called Simply Energy in those two states. Simply Energy became part of GDF Suez in 2012. It is now owned by ENGIE with the French Government having control of this entity.

Controversy
Simply Energy have been subject to many high profile complaints regarding the practices of their doorknockers and billing issues.

References

External links
 

Electric power companies of Australia
Natural gas companies of Australia
Utility companies of Australia